DMAX is a thematic network television owned by Warner Bros. Discovery. The Italian version of the channel began its broadcasting at 6:45 pm on 10 November 2011 with the show Destroyed in Seconds. DMAX is available on channel 52 of digital television, on Sky Italia at channel 136 in HD and on Tivù Sat at channel 28 in HD. It is the first factual-entertainment channel for a male audience in Italy.

From 17 December 2012, it broadcasts on Tivùsat at LCN 28 and moves to LCN 808 of Sky Italia. From 9 April 2014 it moved to LCN 136 of Sky Italia, with the official launch of the +1 version at LCN 137. From 7 November of the same year DMAX also broadcasts in HD on the Sky Italia platform.

From 1 March 2019 DMAX HD and DMAX +1 become visible also on Tivùsat at LCN 28 and 128, replacing the SD version. On 13 March 2019 definitively closes the SD version on the satellite, also disappearing from Sky Italia. From 9 April DMAX, together with the other free channels of the group, is also available in high definition streaming on Dplay.

On 1 December 2020, DMAX +1 was shut down. It will cover all Six Nations matches until 2021.

Programming

Original programs
 Affari a quattro ruote Italia
 Campioni sempre
 DMAX su Quattroruote
 Due rugbisti e una meta
 Football Hooligans – con Michele Dalai
 I re della griglia
 Il cacciatore di tifosi
 La salumeria dei pugni
 Lady Ferro
 Milano City Tattoo
 Unti e bisunti

Imported programs 

 1000 modi per morire (1000 Ways to Die)
 A caccia di veleni (Wild Recon)
 Affare fatto (Auction Hunters)
 Affari a quattro ruote (Wheeler Dealers)
 Affari in valigia (Baggage Battles)
 Airport Security (Border Security: Australia's Front Line)
 Airport Security: Canada (Border Security: Canada's Front Line)
 Airport Security: Nuova Zelanda (Border Patrol)
 American Chopper
 American Hot Rod
 Anatomia di un disastro (Anatomy of a Disaster)
 Animal Cops
 Armi del futuro (Future Weapons)
 Bear Grylls – Celebrity Edition (Running Wild with Bear Grylls)
 Bear Grylls – Giungla urbana (Worst Case Scenario)
 Bear Grylls – L'ultimo sopravvissuto (Man vs. Wild)
 Bellator MMA
 Bizarre ER
 Brutti, sporchi e affamati (Hairy Bikers)
 Cacciatori di fantasmi (Ghost Adventures)
 Cacciatori di tesori (American Digger)
 Carcere duro (Behind Bars)
 Cattivissimi amici (Impractical Jokers)
 Ci sei o ci fai? (World's Craziest Fools)
 Come è fatto (How It's Made)
 Come è fatto il cibo (Food Factory)
 Destroyed in Seconds
 Dual Survival
 Due macchine da soldi (Lords of the Car Hoards)
 Dynamo – Magie impossibili (Dynamo: Magician Impossible)
 È nata una... (Is Born series)
 Effetto rallenty (Time Warp)
 Elite Police
 I maghi delle auto (Classic Car Rescue)
 Il banco dei pugni (Hardcore Pawn)
 Il laboratorio del cibo (Jimmy's Farm)
 Il signore degli insetti (Wild Things with Dominic Monaghan)
 Ink Master
 Jurassic Wars (Jurassic Fight Club)
 Killer Karaoke
 LA Ink
 La prova del diavolo (Cutthroat Kitchen)
 Le meraviglie dell'Universo (Wonders of the Universe)
 Lavori sporchi (Dirty Jobs)
 London Garage (Chop Shop: London Garage)
 London Ink
 Man v. Food
 Matto da pescare (Off the Hook: Extreme Catches)
 Miami Ink
 Megacostruzioni (Build it Bigger and Mega Builders)
 Moonshiners
 Most Shocking
 MythBusters
 Nudi e crudi (Naked and Afraid)
 NY Ink
 Oro degli abissi (Bering Sea Gold)
 Orrori da gustare (Bizarre Foods with Andrew Zimmern)
 Recupero crediti (Lizard Lick Towing)
 Rimozione forzata (South Beach Tow)
 River Monsters
 Scemo di viaggio (An Idiot Abroad)
 Stan Lee's Superhumans
 Storage Wars: Canada
 Street Customs (West Coast Customs)
 Survivorman
 Te l'avevo detto (You Have Been Warned)
 Texas Tarzan (Lone Star Legend)
 The Vanilla Ice Project
 Top Gear
 Turtleman (Call of the Wildman)
 Ultima fermata: Alaska (Railroad Alaska)
 Video del tubo (Rude Tube)
 Wild Frank
 WWE

References

External links
 Official Websites: dmax.it 
 DMAX channel on YouTube

Television channels in Italy
Television stations in Switzerland
Television channels and stations established in 2011
Men's interest channels
Italy
Warner Bros. Discovery EMEA